Vernon is a city and the county seat of Wilbarger County, Texas, United States. and as of the 2010 Census had a population of 11,002.

History

The original town was called Eagle Springs by the indigenous community as early as 1858. After the American Civil War, more settlers began moving in the area, and in 1880, they applied for a post office as Eagle Flat. However, the U.S. Post Office rejected the name, saying too many Texas towns were already called Eagle something. The town then chose the name Vernon, after George Washington's home, Mount Vernon.

An estimated seven million head of cattle passed through Vernon on the Great Western Cattle Trail between 1873 and the 1890s. The historic trail was located 90 miles west of and parallel to the better-known Chisholm Trail.

Geography
Vernon is located at  (34.151116, −99.290473).

According to the United States Census Bureau, the county has a total area of 8.1 sq mi (21.0 km2), of which 0.12% is covered by water.

Climate
The climate in this area is characterized by hot, humid summers and generally mild to cool winters.  According to the Köppen climate classification, Vernon has a humid subtropical climate, Cfa on climate maps.

Demographics

2020 census

As of the 2020 United States census, 10,078 people, 4,160 households, and 2,426 families resided in the city.

2000 census
As of the census of 2000,  11,660 people, 4,506 households, and 2,946 families were residing in the city. The population density was 1,439.2 people/sq mi (555.8/km2). The 5,166 housing units averaged 637.6/sq mi (246.2/km2). The racial makeup of the city was 76.33% White, 9.65% African American, 0.69% Native American, 0.71% Asian,  10.74% from other races, and 1.89% from two or more races. Hispanics or Latinos of any race were 22.39% of the population.

Of the 4,506 households, 31.3% had children under 18 living with them, 49.7% were married couples living together, 11.9% had a female householder with no husband present, and 34.6% were not families. About 31.2% of all households were made up of individuals, and 16.4% had someone living alone who was 65 or older. The average household size was 2.44, and the average family size was 3.07.

In the city, the age distribution was 26.6% under 18, 10.1% from 18 to 24, 25.2% from 25 to 44, 20.9% from 45 to 64, and 17.2% who were 65 or older. The median age was 36 years. For every 100 females, there were 92.4 males. For every 100 females age 18 and over, there were 88.4 males.

The median income for a household in the city was $28,194, and for a family was $36,913. Males had a median income of $25,167 versus $18,971 for females. The per capita income for the city was $15,747. About 10.2% of families and 14.1% of the population were below the poverty line, including 17.2% of those under 18 and 14.6% of those age 65 or over.

Economy
In 1905, the Wichita Mill and Elevator Company, owned and managed by entrepreneur Frank Kell of Wichita Falls, bought a mill in Vernon. Kell's business partner was W. O. Anderson.

Major businesses and industries in Vernon include a Tyson Foods (formerly Wright Brand Foods) bacon-processing plant, a Rhodia, Inc. guar-processing plant, North Texas State Hospital, which is operated by the Texas Department of State Health Services (an agency of the Texas Health and Human Services System), Victory Field Correctional Academy (a juvenile detention facility operated by the Texas Youth Commission), and the Texas AgriLife (Texas A&M System) Research and Extension Center.

The nearby Waggoner Ranch holds the distinction of being the largest spread in Texas under one fence.  The ranch remains operational, with business in petroleum, farming, horses, and cattle. The Waggoner produces some of the best ranch horses in Texas, many from the breeding of the quarter horse Poco Bueno. According to the wishes of E. Paul Waggoner, Poco Bueno is buried in a standing position on the corner at the main entrance to the ranch.

Arts and culture

Santa Rosa Roundup Rodeo
Vernon is host to various events annually, including the four-day Santa Rosa Roundup rodeo in May, which is sponsored by the local Santa Rosa Palomino Club. VSMCA is host to Summer's Last Blast, held the second weekend of August every year - a car show that exhibits a variety of 1950s to late 2000s cars.

Doan's May Picnic

Since 1884, Doan's May Picnic has been held on the first Saturday of May at the ghost town of Doans, located 15 miles north of Vernon. A barbecue lunch and T-shirts are available for sale, and a king and queen are crowned at the annual event. One of the shirts for 2017 featured a design by Harold Dow Bugbee, the late curator of the Panhandle-Plains Historical Museum in Canyon, Texas, which depicts Texas Longhorns and a cowboy crossing the Red River at Doan's Crossing, where the postmaster Corwin F. Doan (1848–1929) also operated a store to supply the cowboys. Bugbee's sculpture is part of the 1931 Trail Drivers Monument located at Doans. Riders cross the river from Oklahoma and usually arrive just before noon. The 1881 adobe house, the oldest in Wilbarger County, is open for tours during the picnic.

Education

Public education
The Vernon Independent School District serves students in prekindergarten through grade 12. The district's school campuses include three elementary schools (prekindergarten through grade 5), a middle school (grades 6–8) and Vernon High School (grades 9–12). The district also operates an alternative-education program and an education program for juveniles of the Adolescent Forensic Program at North Texas State Hospital

Vernon High School's football team, the Vernon Lions, was one of the strongest programs in the 3A division until recently. The Lions won the 3A state championship in 1990 and were ranked number one all year.  They finished in second place the previous year. The Lions have finished as semifinalists in 2003 and 2006, and were ranked in top 10 for the 2007 season, when they lost in a close game in the state quarterfinals to Snyder. The overall record of Vernon High School football is 595-363-38 (a winning percentage of 62.27%)

Vernon High School's first team state championship came in the 1984–1985 season as the Lady Lions won the 3A girls basketball state title. The Lady Lions returned to Austin the next season and were defeated in the semifinals.

Vernon High School is also known for its tennis team, which has completed 23 straight years of going to the Texas Tennis Coaches Association State Team Tennis Tournament. VHS Tennis has six TTCA state team tennis titles and has finished no lower than third place in 22 of the 23 years.

Vernon College

Vernon College, a two-year community college, is located here and maintains a branch campus in Wichita Falls. Academic offerings include cosmetology, nursing, and vocational-technical programs.
Athletically, Vernon College fields women's softball, women's volleyball, men's baseball, and rodeo teams.  The rodeo team is consistently ranked high in junior college-level competition.

Infrastructure

Transportation
Vernon is located 50 miles northwest of Wichita Falls, and about 160 to 180 miles from surrounding metropolitan areas, including Amarillo, Abilene, Oklahoma City, and the DFW Metroplex. The city is served by four U.S. routes: 70, 183, 283, and 287.

Wilbarger County Airport is located 5 miles north of Vernon; the nearest airport with scheduled flights is Wichita Falls Municipal Airport 50 miles to the east, which predominantly offers flights of commuter airlines to Dallas-Fort Worth International Airport.

The nearest international airports from Vernon with major airline connections include Dallas-Fort Worth International Airport, Will Rogers World Airport in Oklahoma City, and Rick Husband Amarillo International Airport in Amarillo.

The area is also served by a BNSF rail freight line bypassing downtown from Ft. Worth to Amarillo.

Notable people
 Marguerite Oswald (1907-1981), mother of Lee Harvey Oswald
 Kay Adams (born 1941), country singer
 Skandor Akbar, former professional wrestler in the Universal Wrestling Federation, 2021 inductee into the Professional Wrestling Hall of Fame
 James Dixon, former professional football player for the Dallas Cowboys
 Robert L. Duncan (born 1953), Republican former member of Texas House of Representatives and Texas State Senate, born in Vernon, resided in Lubbock, where in 2014, he was named chancellor of Texas Tech University System
 Roy C. Farrell (1912–1996), co-founder of Cathay Pacific
 Lawrence Gaines, former professional football player for Detroit Lions
 Clyde Gates (born 1986), NFL wide receiver and return specialist for Miami Dolphins
 Robert Gauldin (born 1931), classical music composer
 Rick Hardcastle (born 1956), Republican former member of Texas House of Representatives from Vernon
 Jerry Haymes (born 1940), musician 
 Bill Herchman, former professional football player for San Francisco 49ers, Dallas Cowboys and Houston Oilers
 Jack English Hightower (born 1926), politician, former 46th Judicial District Attorney
 Dan Kubiak (1938–1998), politician; taught and coached in Vernon in 1962–1963 academic year
 John C. Morgan (1914–1991), World War II United States Army Air Forces B-17 pilot and Medal of Honor recipient
 Roy Orbison (1936–1988), nicknamed "The Big O," Orbison was a Grammy Award-winning singer-songwriter and guitarist, and a pioneer of rock and roll, whose recording career spanned more than four decades
 Mac Percival, former professional football player for Chicago Bears and Dallas Cowboys
 Daryl Richardson (born 1990), NFL running back for the Cleveland Browns
 Eck Robertson (1887–1975), fiddle player, noted as first country musician to be commercially recorded (1922)
 Cory Roper (born 1977), NASCAR Camping World Truck Series driver 
 Bernard Scott (born 1984), former NFL running back for the Cincinnati Bengals
 Kenneth Starr, lead prosecutor in Clinton impeachment and later president of Baylor University
 Jack Teagarden (1905–1964), influential jazz trombonist and vocalist

1979 tornado
On April 10, 1979, Vernon and surrounding Wilbarger County were struck by an F4 tornado, a part of a large storm in the Red River Valley. Much of Vernon was damaged or destroyed, and 11 people were killed as the tornado passed through Foard and Wilbarger Counties before it dissipated in a rural portion of Tillman County, Oklahoma. That same day, tornadoes also devastated the larger nearby cities of Wichita Falls and Lawton.

See also
Vernon Plaza Theatre

References

External links
 The Vernon Daily Record – Newspaper
 
 Vernon Chamber of Commerce
 Vernon College
 Vernon Independent School District
 Historic Vernon materials, hosted by the Portal to Texas History.

 
Cities in Wilbarger County, Texas
Cities in Texas
County seats in Texas
Micropolitan areas of Texas